New York's 26th State Assembly district is one of the 150 districts in the New York State Assembly in the United States. It has been represented by Democrat Edward Braunstein since 2011.

Geography 
District 26 is located in Queens, comprising the neighborhoods of Bayside, Douglaston, Little Neck, Beechhurst, and parts of Whitestone, Glen Oaks,  and Auburndale.

Recent election results

2022

2020

2018

2016

2014

2012

References 

26
Queens, New York